Flindersia dissosperma, commonly known as scrub leopardwood, is a species of small tree in the family Rutaceae and is endemic to eastern-central Queensland. It usually has pinnate leaves with between three and five elliptical to egg-shaped leaves, panicles of white to cream-coloured flowers and fruit studded with rough points.

Description

Taxonomy
Scrub leopardwood was first formally described in 1857 by Ferdinand von Mueller who published the description in Hooker's Journal of Botany and Kew Garden Miscellany and gave the plant the name Strzeleckya dissosperma. In 1929, Karel Domin changed the name to Flindersia dissosperma in Bibliotheca Botanica.

Distribution and habitat
Scrub leopardwood mainly grows in dry scrub, often with brigalow (Acacia harpophylla) and poplar box (Eucalyptus populnea). It is found in east-central Queensland from near Charters Towers to near Springsure.

Conservation status
Flindersia dissosperma is classified as of "least concern" under the Queensland Government Nature Conservation Act 1992.

References

dissosperma
Sapindales of Australia
Flora of Queensland
Taxa named by Ferdinand von Mueller
Trees of Australia
Plants described in 1857